Novia, Esposa y Amante (English: Girlfriend, wife and lover) is a Mexican motion picture categorized as drama and romance film released in 1980.

Synopsis  
A wealthy young woman studies acting and meets a young film director who offers an independent film starring. Time goes by and they form a couple, but she realizes that he has no interests and aims to be the same thing in life. At the same time, she meets another film director and falls in love with him and then they get married. This man is a former partner of a strong woman who ends up hitting the girl. When her father dies, a friend offers her to take her away from her husband and offers her financial help. This relationship is transformed into an affair.

Cast 
 Pedro Armendáriz, Jr. → Esteban Ampudia
 Raúl Ramírez → Rodolfo Morales
 Mónica Prado → Irene
 Guillermo Capetillo → Juan
 Carlos East → Sr. Mendoza
 Daniela Romo → Laura Mendoza
 Víctor Junco → Ingeniero
 Marcelo Villamil → Painter

External links 
 

1980 films
1980s Spanish-language films
1980 romantic drama films
Mexican romantic drama films
1980s Mexican films